Miltiadis Gouskos (or Gouschos) (born 1877 in Zakynthos, Greece; died 9 July 1903 in British Raj) was a Greek athlete. He was born in Zakynthos and died in the British Indian Empire from food poisoning. He competed at the 1896 Summer Olympics in Athens in the shot put, placing second to Robert Garrett of the United States. Gouskos's best throw was 11.03 metres, short of Garrett's 11.22 metres.

Notes

External links

1877 births
1903 deaths
Greek male shot putters
Olympic athletes of Greece
Athletes (track and field) at the 1896 Summer Olympics
19th-century sportsmen
Olympic silver medalists for Greece
People from Zakynthos
Medalists at the 1896 Summer Olympics
Olympic silver medalists in athletics (track and field)
Date of birth missing
Sportspeople from the Ionian Islands (region)
Expatriates from Greece in British India